Llangibby Castle or Llangybi Castle is a castle near Llangybi, Monmouthshire.

MV Llangibby Castle was a British passenger ship in service between 1929 and 1954